Strenger is a surname. Notable people with the surname include:

 Carlo Strenger (1958–2019), Swiss-Israeli psychologist, philosopher, existential psychoanalyst, and public intellectual
 Rich Strenger (born 1960), American football player

See also
Stringer (name)